Brian Peter Leon Lightman  (born 15 June 1955) is a British trade union leader who is the former General Secretary of the Association of School and College Leaders (ASCL, based in Leicester). The ASCL has around 18,000 teachers.

Early life
He attended Westminster City Grammar School from 1966-73. At the University of Southampton he gained a BA in German in 1978 and a Modern Languages PGCE in 1979.

Career
He taught German and French from 1979-84 at Hazelwick School in Crawley in West Sussex. From 1989-91 he was Curriculum Development Manager and from 1991-95 Deputy Head at St Martin's School, Brentwood. From 1995-99 he was Headmaster at Llantwit Major School in the Vale of Glamorgan, and from 1999-2010 at St Cyres School.

ASCL
He was a representative for the Secondary Heads Association, being the Welsh representative of the National Council from 1998-2010. He was President from 2007-08. He became General Secretary of the ASCL on 1 September 2010. He succeeded John Dunford, who had been there since 1998, and who is now involved with the pupil premium. On 28 January 2016 he left his position, and was succeeded by Malcolm Trobe, the Headmaster of Malmesbury School (former Malmesbury Grammar School).

In January 2006 the Secondary Heads Association became the ASCL; the Secondary Heads Association had been formed in 1977

Personal life
He married Eva in 1981. They have four daughters. He currently lives off the B582 in the south-east of Leicester near the University of Leicester Botanic Garden. Until recently he lived in Lisvane, in the north of Cardiff.

References

External links
 Careers & Enterprise Company

Living people
1955 births
Alumni of the University of Southampton
Schoolteachers from London
General secretaries of British trade unions
Language teachers
Trade unionists from Cardiff
Schoolteachers from Sussex
Welsh schoolteachers